The Owl and the Nightingale is a twelfth- or thirteenth-century Middle English poem detailing a debate between an owl and a nightingale as overheard by the poem's narrator. It is the earliest example in Middle English of a literary form known as debate poetry (or verse contest).

Verse contests from this time period were usually written in Anglo-Norman or Latin. This poem shows the influence of French linguistic, literary, and rhetorical techniques. After the Norman conquest, French became a predominant language in England, but English was still widespread and recognized as an acceptable language for poetry, if only burlesque debates.

Date, authorship and provenance
There is no certain information about the poem's author, date of composition or origin.

Nicholas of Guildford is mentioned several times in the text as the man best suited to judge which bird presents the strongest argument. His character never actually makes an appearance, and the poem ends with the debate unresolved and the owl and nightingale flying off in search of Nicholas. Critics tend to agree that the most likely reason for the mention of Nicholas of Guildford in the poem is because he is the author. However, in the introduction to the latest translation on the text, Neil Cartlidge reminds the reader that despite the general acceptance of Nicholas as author "...there is no firm evidence to support such an identification and no certain trace of the existence of any Nicholas of Guildford, priest of Portesham, beyond the text itself".

It is equally difficult to establish an exact date when The Owl and the Nightingale was first written. The two surviving manuscripts are thought to be copied from one exemplar, and they are dated to the second half of the 13th century.  In lines 1091–2, the nightingale prays for the soul of "king Henri", which is thought to reference "either the death of Henry II of England in 1189 or of Henry III of England in 1272". Scholars see no evidence that the poem predates the surviving manuscripts by many years. It is possible that the poem was written in the 12th or 13th century; Cartlidge argues that it is from after the death of Henry III in 1272.

Linguistic evidence suggests the poem's origins lie in Kent or a neighbouring region, but there is little evidence to support this theory. Because The Owl and the Nightingale cannot be accurately dated, it is nearly impossible to properly reconstruct the original dialect.  Recent scholarship also acknowledges that provenance could be anywhere in Wessex, the Home Counties or the south-west Midlands.

Manuscripts

There are two known manuscripts of The Owl and the Nightingale: ff. 156–68 of Jesus College, Oxford, MS.29 and ff. 233–46 of British Library, Cotton MS. Caligula A. ix. Both are bound together in collections of other works. They are both estimated to be written in the latter half of the 13th century and copied from one exemplar which is now lost 

Jesus College, Oxford, MS. 29:

This manuscript, given to Jesus College between 1684 and 1697 by rector Thomas Wilkins, contains 33 texts in English, Anglo Norman, and Latin. All of the script is in one hand and written in a plain, amateurish style. The Owl and Nightingale is written in two columns with some capital letters in blue and red but no illumination.

Cotton Caligula A.IX:

This manuscript contains 13 texts in English and Anglo Norman, most of which were probably bound together from the beginning despite Cotton’s method of organizing disparate manuscripts into collections. The text, written by at least two different scribes, is in two columns with some capital letters in red and no illumination. The script is a professional, gothic bookhand. This manuscript has a 19th-century binding and shows no evidence of whom the previous owner(s) may have been.

Summary
The poem consists entirely of a fierce debate between the eponymous owl and nightingale, as overheard by an unidentified narrator. When he first happens upon them, the Nightingale is perched on a blossom-covered branch, and the Owl is sitting on a bough overgrown with ivy. The Nightingale begins the argument by noting the Owl's physique, calling her ugly and unclean. The Owl proposes that they proceed civilly and reasonably in their debate, and the Nightingale suggests consulting Nicholas of Guildford, who, although frivolous in his youth, is now a reasonable judge. However, the Nightingale immediately goes on to shame the Owl for the screeches and shrieks she produces, and equates her active time of night with vices and hatred. The Owl in turn posits that the Nightingale's continuous noise is excessive and boring.

The Nightingale replies that the song of the Owl brings unwanted gloom, while her own is joyous and reflects the beauty of the world. The Owl is quick to reply that Nightingales only sing in summer, when men's minds are filled with lechery. Furthermore, singing is the Nightingale's only talent. The Owl has more valuable skills, like servicing churches by ridding them of rats. The Nightingale claims she too is helpful to the Church, since her songs invoke the glories of Heaven, and encourage churchgoers to be more devout. The Owl counters that before people can reach Heaven, they must repent their sins. Her mournful, haunting song makes them reconsider their decisions. She further states that the Nightingale's gay melodies can entice women to adultery and promiscuity. It is the nature of women to be frail, the Nightingale claims, and any sins they might commit in maidenhood are forgiven once they are married. It is rather the fault of men, for taking advantage of this weakness in maidens.

The Nightingale, not to be outdone, claims that the Owl is of no use except when dead, since farmers use her corpse as a scarecrow. The Owl gives a positive slant to this charge by inferring that she helps men even after death. This is not seen as a sufficient refutation to the Nightingale, and she calls other birds to jeer at the Owl. The Owl threatens to assemble her predatory friends, but before the tension can escalate further, the Wren descends to quiet the quarrel. The birds ultimately decide to defer judgment of their case to Nicholas of Guildford, who lives at Portesham in Dorset.

There is a brief digression about the merits of Nicholas and how unfortunate it is that he is unappreciated and underpaid by bishops and wealthy men. The owl and nightingale agree to find the wise man and the owl claims that her memory is so excellent that she can repeat every word of the argument when they arrive. However, the reader never learns which bird bests her opponent at the debate; the poem ends with the two flying off in search of Nicholas.

Structure

Style and form
The text is composed of rhyming octosyllabic couplets, generally following the poetic construction of iambic tetrameter.

Iambic tetrameter, while commonly used to create flowing lyricism and ease of reading, can quickly become monotonous, with the repetitive pattern distracting from the subject matter. The poet avoids this by including variety in his meter, occasionally adding or omitting syllables. The poem is also rife with imagery, alliteration, and assonance.

The poem's language is not superfluously dense or grandiloquent. The birds' dialogue is colloquial, and their insults are scathing. The analogies employed are also rural, equating the Nightingale's song to the barbarous speech of an Irish priest ("Þu chatereſt ſo doþ on Yris preſt" [322]), referring to fox hunts, and commenting on the use and practicality of scarecrows.

Genre
Medieval debate poetry was popular in the twelfth and thirteenth centuries, and this poem draws on their structure, mimicking legal suits of the time.  Each bird charges the other with an accusation, and brings forth evidence to support her claim. Proverbs are cited as a rhetorical argument from authority. However, the birds' rhetorical techniques are highly flawed. The birds' attack strategies rely on belittlement, condescension, and analogising their opponent's habits to unsavoury people or things.

The animals' defence is founded on self-praise, as each bird justifies her behaviours and attempts to show the benefits in her own actions.  However, the Owl berates the Nightingale for a quality she herself possesses, and the Nightingale's self-defence argument follows the same logic as offered by the Owl. Both use their song as a way to encourage proper religious thought and behaviour.  The Nightingale simulates the auditory pleasures of heaven,

while the Owl coerces people to repent, and warns them of what awaits them should they sin.

References and context
Alfred
At many points in the poem, the birds cite King Alfred as a source of wise dicta. Although there was a medieval compendium of sayings attributed to Alfred, the birds in the poem are not actually quoting it.  These references do acknowledge his wisdom and authority, but are little more than appeals to Alfred's generic image as a wise, just, and learned ruler from England's past.
Bestiary
The animals' characteristics follow heavily on the tradition of a bestiary, a concise catalogue where animals are listed, and their characteristics are described, along with the symbolic and allegorical associations and morally significant qualities they represent.  One of the birds' goals through their debate is to assign meaning and purpose to their own characteristics. According to Genesis 1:26, all creatures were made by God to serve man, "And God said, Let us make man in our image, after our likeness: and let them have dominion over the fish of the sea, and over the fowl of the air, and over the cattle, and over all the earth, and over every creeping thing that creepeth upon the earth." (Genesis 1:26, King James Bible) Given this view, it makes sense the birds see their value as directly proportional to their usefulness to mankind.
Clergy
Near the end of the poem, the bishops of Portesham are condemned for prohibiting Master Nicholas to live with them.  They bestow higher jobs to unintelligent men and display nepotism. Since the housing of bishops is hardly a concern of birds, scholars have interpreted this reference as a contention the author had with the institution.  Nicholas himself is speculated to be the author, although directly pointing out irritation at his superiors would be unlikely to win him any advancement.
Christ
Both animals are presumptuous in their claims of value, but the Owl goes so far as to imply she displays Christ-like sacrifice and compassion.  With imagery reminiscent of the crucifixion of Jesus, she remarks on how useful she is even after death:

Interpretation, criticism, and analysis
Most scholars in the past have defined the work as an allegory, yet the difficulty of sustaining this method of analysis throughout the poem remains a challenge. These interpretations tend to characterise each principal figure in polar opposition to the other, and since scholar Kathryn Hume's work on the text has encouraged other scholars to turn to format and structure rather than symbolic characterisation.

Disregarding an allegorical interpretation, critics have taken the position that the two figures of the text do represent symbolic depictions of people, institutions, and other forces. The question of date and authorship make any certainty about the text a challenge to interpretation. The most consistent theme in the piece is the determination of the birds to trounce their opponent no matter the lengths to which their argument must stretch.

It has also been suggested that the owl and nightingale represent historical figures, which necessarily grounds these arguments in a very specific time. Scholar Anne Baldwin posits that the poem was written between 1174 and 1175, and that the nightingale represents King Henry II and the owl is Thomas Becket, Archbishop of Canterbury.

Several scholars have focused on comparisons between the structures in the medieval legal system and that of the poem itself. The birds take turns presenting their arguments as they would have done in a contemporary court, while also structuring their arguments as legal defences and providing the opinions of authorities to strengthen their cases. While the unknown date of creation yet again foils any certain comparison, analyses have ranged from imitations of 12th- or 13th-century court mechanisms to no actual comparison, with acknowledgement that the author was indeed acquainted with judicial proceedings. In 1994, Monica Potkay also proposed that the legal system on which the poem is based is that of natural rather than English "common" law, a legal framework predicated on God's power over the Earth and its inhabitants.

In short, there remains no consensus regarding the ultimate analysis of this enigmatic work. Without a definite provenance and authorship, the possibility of a positive identification of the symbolism within the text is limited.

Editions and translations

 Facsimile edition

 Also available here.
 Also available here, here, here and here

References

Further reading

Huganir, Kathryn (1931). The Owl and the Nightingale: Sources, Date, Author. Philadelphia, University of Pennsylvania Press.

External links

London, British Library, Cotton MS Caligula A IX: digitized manuscript
British Library summary of the poem
Oxford, Jesus College, MS. 29: digitized manuscript
Online text
Stanley 1972 text with gloss

Middle English poems
Cotton Library
Poems about nightingales
Works of unknown authorship
Owls in culture